Sheerin is an Irish surname. It is a variant of Sheeran, a reduced form of O’Sheeran which is an Anglicized form of Ó Sírín  or Ó Síoráin  meaning ‘descendant of Sírín/Síorán'. Derived from the personal name Síorán, from a diminutive of síor meaning ‘long-lasting’.

Surname
Chuck Sheerin (1909-1986), American professional baseball player
Emma Sheerin (born 1991/2), Northern Irish politician
Gay Sheerin, Irish Gaelic football goalkeeper and manager
Joe Sheerin (born 1979), English professional footballer
Jordyn Sheerin (born 1989), Scottish professional footballer
Mike Sheerin, Canadian television producer
Orlagh Máire Sheerin (born 1998), Irish celebrity
Paul Sheerin (born 1974), Scottish football player and coach

References